Ophidion josephi is a fish species in the family Ophidiidae. Widespread in the Western Atlantic from Georgia to Florida, also in the Gulf of Mexico. Marine tropical demersal fish. The specific name josephi refers to St Joseph Island in Texas where the type specimen was collected.

References

Ophidion (fish)
Fish described in 1858
Fish of the Atlantic Ocean
Fish of North America
Fish of the United States
Fish of the Gulf of Mexico